The Madras Medical Mission is a hospital located in Chennai. The first unit of the hospital was set up in 1987. The hospital houses 300 beds including 76 intensive care beds.

See also

 Healthcare in Chennai
 Medical missions

References

External links 
Official website

Hospital buildings completed in 1987
Hospitals in Chennai
1987 establishments in Tamil Nadu
20th-century architecture in India